Erik Ron (born July 4, 1985) is an American producer, mixer, and songwriter based in Los Angeles. He has worked with artists such as Panic! at the Disco, Set It Off, Issues, New Years Day, Too Close to Touch, I the Mighty, Motionless In White, Blessthefall, I See Stars, Sylar, Attila, and Godsmack.

Life and career

Early years 
Erik Ron was born in San Francisco, California, and grew up in the suburb of San Carlos, California, where he attended Carlmont High School. Erik started playing music as a teenager in alternative rock band Impel. After high school, he studied engineering at Musicians Institute College of Contemporary Music in Los Angeles. Erik proceeded to work as in-house engineer at Woodland Ranch Studio between the years of 2005–2008 before working as an engineer under producer/writer John Feldmann between 2008–2011 in Bel Air, CA.

2013–present 
In 2013, Erik built and opened "Grey Area Studios" in North Hollywood. Since opening the studio to focus on his own production career, Erik has worked with Panic! at the Disco, Set It Off, Issues, New Years Day, Too Close to Touch, I Prevail, Motionless in White, This Wild Life, Young Guns, The Word Alive,  Blessthefall, I See Stars, Palisades, Sylar, and Attila, and more. In early 2016, Erik Ron inked an exclusive publishing deal with BMG Rights Management.

In September 2017, it was announced that Ron will be at the helm of the seventh studio album of the rock band Godsmack.

Selected discography

References 

Living people
Record producers from California
1985 births
People from San Mateo County, California